The 1975–76 Algerian Championnat National was the 14th season of the Algerian Championnat National since its establishment in 1962. A total of 16 teams contested the league, with MC Alger as the defending champions.

Team summaries

Promotion and relegation 
Teams promoted from Algerian Division 2 1975-1976 
 RCG Oran
 ES Guelma
 ASO Chlef

Teams relegated to Algerian Division 2 1976-1977
 WA Boufarik
 Hamra Annaba
 USM Khenchela
 USM Bel-Abbès
 ASM Oran

League table

References

External links
1975–76 Algerian Championnat National

Algerian Ligue Professionnelle 1 seasons
1975–76 in Algerian football
Algeria